
Year 54 BC was a year of the pre-Julian Roman calendar. At the time, it was known as the Year of the Consulship of Appius and Ahenobarbus (or, less frequently, year 700 Ab urbe condita). The denomination 54 BC for this year has been used since the early medieval period, when the Anno Domini calendar era became the prevalent method in Europe for naming years.

Events 
 By place 

 Roman Republic 
 Consuls: Appius Claudius Pulcher and Lucius Domitius Ahenobarbus.
 Fifth year of Julius Caesar's Gallic Wars:
 July – Second of Caesar's Invasions of Britain: Julius Caesar receives nominal submission from the tribal chief Cassivellaunus and installs Mandubracius as a friendly king.
 Winter – Ambiorix revolts in Gaul. He joins with Catuvolcus in an uprising against the Roman army. Caesar's senior officers Lucius Aurunculeius Cotta and Quintus Titurius Sabinus are ambushed by the Eburones, and killed along with almost their entire forces.
 Pompey builds the first permanent theatre in Rome.
 Crassus arrives in Syria as proconsul and invades the Parthian Empire, initiating the Roman–Persian Wars, which were to last nearly seven centuries.
 Octavia the Younger and Gaius Claudius Marcellus marry.
 The beginning of the breakup of the First Triumvirate with the death of Caesar's daughter Julia.

Births 
 Gnaeus Cornelius Lentulus, Roman consul (d. AD 25)
 Seneca the Elder, Roman rhetorician and writer
 Tibullus, Roman poet and writer (d. 19 BC)

Deaths 
 July 31 – Aurelia Cotta, mother of Julius Caesar (b. 120 BC)
 Ariovistus, leader of the Suebi (approximated date)
 Gaius Valerius Catullus, Roman poet and writer (b. 84 BC)
 Huo Chengjun, empress of the Han Dynasty
 Julia, daughter of Julius Caesar (dies in childbirth) 
 Lucius Aurunculeius Cotta, Roman legate of Julius Caesar
 Lucius Gellius Publicola, Roman politician (approximate date)
 Lucius Valerius Flaccus, Roman tribune and praetor
 Mithridates III, king of Parthia (executed by Orodes II) 
 Quintus Laberius Durus, Roman tribune of Julius Caesar
 Quintus Titurius Sabinus, Roman legate of Julius Caesar

References